Clavatula imperialis is a species of sea snail, a marine gastropod mollusk in the family Clavatulidae.

Description
The size of an adult shell varies between 25 mm and 50 mm. The ovate shell is short and ventricose. It is clothed with a thick, dark olive-colored epidermis. The whorls are angulated above, the angle having a row of scale-like tubercles. The columella is covered with a thick white callus. The interior of the aperture is stained above and below with violet.

Distribution
This species occurs in the Atlantic Ocean between Democratic Republic of the Congo and Angola.

References

 Gofas, S.; Afonso, J.P.; Brandào, M. (Ed.). (S.a.). Conchas e Moluscos de Angola = Coquillages et Mollusques d'Angola. [Shells and molluscs of Angola]. Universidade Agostinho / Elf Aquitaine Angola: Angola. 140 pp

External links
 

imperialis
Gastropods described in 1816